The 1930 Idaho Vandals football team represented the University of Idaho in the 1930 college football season. The Vandals were led by second-year head coach Leo Calland, and were members of the Pacific Coast Conference. Home games were played on campus in Moscow at MacLean Field, with one in Boise at Public School Field.

Idaho compiled a  overall record but lost all five games in the PCC.  For the only time in Calland's six seasons as head coach, the Vandals lost to rival Montana.

In the Battle of the Palouse with neighbor Washington State, the Vandals suffered a fourth straight loss, falling  at homecoming in Moscow on  Idaho's most recent win in the series was five years earlier in 1925 and the next was 24 years away in 1954.

Schedule

 The Little Brown Stein trophy for the Montana game debuted seven years later in 1938

All-conference
No Vandals were named to the All-Coast team; on the All-Northwest team, fullback Fred Wilkie was a second team selection.

References

External links
Gem of the Mountains: 1931 University of Idaho yearbook – 1930 football season
Go Mighty Vandals – 1930 football season
Idaho Argonaut – student newspaper – 1930 editions

Idaho
Idaho Vandals football seasons
Idaho Vandals football